Fábio Leandro Freitas Gouveia Carvalho (born 30 August 2002) is a Portuguese professional footballer who plays as a winger or attacking midfielder for Premier League club Liverpool.

A former youth international for England, Carvalho now represents Portugal internationally at under-21 level.

Early life and career
Carvalho was born in Torres Vedras, in the Lisbon District of Portugal. He was born to an Angolan father and a Portuguese mother. He played in the youth academy of Olivais Sul and Benfica before moving with his family to London in England in 2013. He played for Balham before being signed by Fulham in 2015.

Club career

Fulham
In May 2020, Carvalho signed his first professional contract with Fulham, for two years. On 23 September, Carvalho made his first-team debut as a substitute in a 2–0 EFL Cup victory over Sheffield Wednesday. On 15 May 2021, Carvalho scored his first goal in a 3–1 away league defeat to Southampton.

Carvalho had an impressive start to the 2021–22 season, scoring three goals in his first five matches as Fulham looked to return to the Premier League. As a result, Carvalho was awarded the EFL Young Player of the Month for August 2021.

Liverpool
Carvalho agreed to sign for Premier League club Liverpool in May 2022 for a reported fee of £5 million, potentially rising to £7.7 million with add-ons. The transfer became official on 1 July and Carvalho was officially unveiled two days later. He scored his first goal for the club on 27 August in a 9–0 home win over AFC Bournemouth in the Premier League. Four days later, on 31 August, he scored a 98th minute match-winning goal during a 2–1 victory against Newcastle United at Anfield.

International career
Carvalho has represented England up to under-18 level.

Carvalho was called up to Portugal's under-21 team on 17 March 2022, ahead of European Championship qualifying games against Iceland and Greece.

In October 2022, he was named in Portugal's preliminary 55-man squad for the 2022 FIFA World Cup in Qatar. However, he was not selected as part of the final 26-man squad.

Career statistics

Honours
Fulham
EFL Championship: 2021–22

Liverpool
FA Community Shield: 2022

Individual
EFL Young Player of the Month: August 2021
PFA Team of the Year: 2021–22 Championship

References

External links

Profile at the Liverpool F.C. website

2002 births
Living people
Sportspeople from Lisbon District
Portuguese footballers
English footballers
Association football midfielders
Association football wingers
Fulham F.C. players
Liverpool F.C. players
Premier League players
English Football League players
England youth international footballers
Portugal under-21 international footballers
Portuguese emigrants to England
English people of Angolan descent
English people of Portuguese descent
Portuguese sportspeople of Angolan descent